Henry Bartlett (fl. 1406–1410) of Bath, Somerset, was an English politician, cloth merchant and pirate in the English Channel.

He was a Member (MP) of the Parliament of England for Bath in 1406, 1407 and 1410.

References

14th-century births
15th-century deaths
People from Bath, Somerset
English MPs 1406
English MPs 1407
English MPs 1410